Tomskoye is a rural locality (a selo) and the administrative center of Tomsky Selsoviet of Seryshevsky District, Amur Oblast, Russia. The population was 2,014 as of 2018. There are 14 streets.

Geography 
Tomskoye is located on the Tom River, 21 km south of Seryshevo (the district's administrative centre) by road. Bochkaryovka is the nearest rural locality.

References 

Rural localities in Seryshevsky District